Dale Maxwell Evans (February 9, 1937 – May 7, 2014) was an American football player and coach. He served as the head football coach at Salem International University in Salem, West Virginia, in 1966 before accepting a post as the freshman coach at West Virginia University in Morgantown, West Virginia, in 1967.

References

1937 births
2014 deaths
Colorado Buffaloes football coaches
North Carolina Tar Heels football coaches
South Carolina Gamecocks football coaches
West Virginia Mountaineers football coaches
West Virginia Mountaineers football players
Texas Tech Red Raiders football coaches
High school football coaches in South Carolina
High school football coaches in West Virginia
People from Tucker County, West Virginia
Players of American football from West Virginia